Sylvain Matrisciano (born 6 July 1963) is a retired French football goalkeeper and later manager.

References

1963 births
Living people
French footballers
Racing Besançon players
Lille OSC players
AS Nancy Lorraine players
Valenciennes FC players
Association football goalkeepers
Ligue 1 players
French football managers
Racing Besançon managers
Stade Brestois 29 managers